Frederik Willem Wepener (born 2 April 1981) is a South African rugby union footballer.

References

External links

Willie Wepener at itsrugby.co.uk
Bulls profile

1981 births
Living people
Afrikaner people
ASM Clermont Auvergne players
Blue Bulls players
Bulls (rugby union) players
Expatriate rugby union players in France
Golden Lions players
Griquas (rugby union) players
Leopards (rugby union) players
Lions (United Rugby Championship) players
Rugby union hookers
Rugby union players from Newcastle, KwaZulu-Natal
South African expatriate rugby union players
South African expatriate sportspeople in France
South African rugby union players